is a Japanese football player. He plays for Saurcos Fukui.

Playing career
Yuki Kawabe joined the FC Machida Zelvia in 2010. He moved to AC Nagano Parceiro in 2012 and played for the club until 2014. He then moved to FC Ryukyu in 2015 and to Saurcos Fukui in 2016.

References

External links

1987 births
Living people
Kokushikan University alumni
Association football people from Tokyo
Japanese footballers
J3 League players
Japan Football League players
FC Machida Zelvia players
AC Nagano Parceiro players
FC Ryukyu players
Association football defenders